The 1949 World University Cycling Championship was a World University Cycling Championship not organized by the International University Sports Federation (FISU). The championship consisted of a road cycling road  race event and a team pursuit. Both were won by Jean Bobet from France.

Events summary

Road Cycling

Track Cycling

References

World University Cycling Championships
World Championships
1949 Student World Championships
1949 in cycle racing
1949 in track cycling